Kantner is an unincorporated community in Somerset County, Pennsylvania, United States. Kantner had a post office until December 20, 2003; it still has its own ZIP code, 15548.

References

Unincorporated communities in Somerset County, Pennsylvania
Unincorporated communities in Pennsylvania